Beta Ho To Aisa is a 1994 Hindi film directed by Late Sir C.P. Dixit, presented by Babubhai latiwala of Bombino video & produced by Late Praveen Khanna; (Govinda ji's brother in law). Starring Govinda, Varsha Usgaonkar, Gulshan Grover and Raza Murad in pivotal roles its fully shot in Mumbai and Kerala.

Plot
Anand is an honest man in a remote city with his pregnant wife Laxmi raising his two adolescent sons; Suraj & Chandar, serviced by a loyal domestic help Dinu and his son Raju whom they have bought up as their own. When Anand and an anguished hier JK witness goons taking real gold; the caravan is plundered for selfish motives. Anand tricks JK and hides the same, arousing the man's wrath though not before he has displaced Lakshmi's family to another city. Gullible Raju with his friend Bantu then take to a rotten life to care for his alive foster mother & family. Educated Suraj & Chander have now grown up. Their sister Asha falls in love with one Ravi. Raju and Jk's daughter Mini fall in love, while Suraj and Chandar are now under Jk. Mini's brother Rakesh helps his father in daily chores. Meanwhile, when Laxmi discovers Raju's means she abandons him. Suraj is supposed to get married to Mini but there is a turn of events.

Old Laxmi finally figures out after incidences she can trust only Raju who craves her blessings.
Laxmi and her daughter Asha leave Ravi and Chander and stay put with poor Raju.

Later Asha gets unfortunately doomed & tries to end her life.

While devastated Mini finds out that JK is actually his distant caretaker uncle.

Yearning for lost gold & her property pushes Mini's uncle off limits as he crosses paths with her love interest Raju once again with latter finally discovering even his lost foster father; real of Suraj & Chander.
In the end good prevails over bad as Anand & Lakhsmi looks on.

Cast

 Govinda as Raju Matthews (Dinu's son)
 Varsha Usgaonkar as Mini (J.K.'s daughter/ Raju's love interest)
 Vijayendra Ghatge as Anand, forest officer
 Anjana Mumtaz as Laxmi (Raju's step-mother)
 Rakesh Pandey as Dinubhai Matthews - Anand's servant and Raju's father
 Mohan Bhandari as Chander (Raju's step-brother)
 Sanjay Jog as Suraj (Raju's step-brother)
 Anuradha Sawant as Asha (Raju's step-sister)
 Asrani as Bantu (Raju's friend)
 Raza Murad as Kunwer / Raja Saheb/ J.K.
 Gulshan Grover as Rakesh (J.K.'s son)
 Sharat Saxena as Raaka / Ramakant, CID Officer
 Viju Khote as eye wit Poojari
 Daboo Malik as Ravi, Police Inspector and Asha's Husband 
 Amrit Patel (actor) as Kasturilal
 Asha Sharma as Manager of women's shelter
 Sudhir as J.K.'s henchman
 Ajit Vachani as  Police Inspector Ram Singh
 Praveen Kumar as Ranjeet, J.K.'s henchman
 Savita Bajaj as Ramakanth Mother, (cameo)
 Ramesh Goyal as S.P.

Soundtrack
All songs were written and composed by late Ravindra Jain.

References

External links

1990s Hindi-language films
1994 films
Films scored by Ravindra Jain